Lisa Perterer (born 16 October 1991 in Villach) is an Austrian professional triathlete, winner of the 2009 Junior European Cup circuit and Austrian Junior Champion 2010. At the 2012 Summer Olympics, she finished in 48th in the individual event.  In 2021, she competed in the women's event at the 2020 Summer Olympics held in Tokyo, Japan, finishing 27th. She was also scheduled to compete in the mixed relay event but the Austrian team did not start.

Career 
In 2011, Perterer changed to the Elite category. At the World Championship Series triathlon in Kitzbuhel, she was included into the start list only thanks to a wildcard.
At the World Cup triathlon in Edmonton, however, still a junior, she most surprisingly won the bronze medal behind Ashleigh Gentle and Mateja Simic and thus proved to be the best Austrian female triathlete, far better than Lydia Waldmüller, who placed 21st.
Thanks to the bronze medal, Lisa Perterer was regularly qualified for the World Championship Series triathlon in Hamburg where she placed 15th and again proved to belong the world elite. At Tiszaújváros she again achieved a good position among the world elite.

Lisa Perterer attended the Sports High School BORG SSLK in Klagenfurt and represents the army club HSV (Heeressportverein) Triathlon Kärnten. In autumn 2011, Perterer joined the sports high performance scheme of the Austrian army.

ITU competitions 

In the four years from 2007 to 2010, Perterer took part in 11 ITU competitions and achieved 9 top ten positions.
The following list is based upon the official ITU rankings and the Athlete's Profile Page.
Unless indicated otherwise, the following events are triathlons (Olympic Distance) and belong to the Elite category.

Notes

External links 
 Lisa Perterer fansite
 Lisa Perterer's website 
 
 

Austrian female triathletes
1991 births
Living people
Sportspeople from Villach
Olympic triathletes of Austria
Triathletes at the 2012 Summer Olympics
Triathletes at the 2020 Summer Olympics
20th-century Austrian women
21st-century Austrian women